Jonathan Victor Anders (born 25 January 1971) was an English cricketer who played all of his cricket for Shropshire.

He was born in Tunbridge Wells and educated at Belvidere School, Shrewsbury. He played at club level for Shrewsbury and Perkins cricket clubs.

His highest score of 51 came when playing for Shropshire in the match against Surrey Cricket Board.  He played 26 games for Shropshire in the Minor Counties Championship. and 19 games for Shropshire in the MCCA Knockout Trophy.

References

External links
 Cricket Archive Profile

English cricketers
Shropshire cricketers
People from Royal Tunbridge Wells
Living people
1971 births